Sublime Acoustic: Bradley Nowell & Friends is an album of mostly acoustic performances by the band Sublime, primarily solo recordings by singer and guitarist Bradley Nowell. It is noted for the fact that it does not include a front insert and that the compact disc is made to look like a recordable CD. Only the 2016 vinyl release has an album cover.

Track listing
 "Wrong Way" – 0:50
 "Saw Red" – 2:47
 "Foolish Fool" – 2:18 (originally performed by Dee Dee Warwick)
 "Don't Push" – 2:58
 "Mary/Big Salty Tears" – 4:57 ("Big Salty Tears" originally performed by The Ziggens)
 "Boss D.J." – 3:05
 "Garden Grove" – 1:58
 "Rivers of Babylon" – 2:39 (originally performed by The Melodians)
 "Little District" – 1:57 (originally performed by Eric "Monty" Morris)
 "KRS-One" – 3:38
 "Marley Medley" – 3:00 (originally performed by Bob Marley)
 "What Happened/Eye of Fatima" – 1:58 ("Eye of Fatima" originally performed by Camper Van Beethoven)
 "Freeway Time in L.A. County Jail" – 4:23
 "Pool Shark" – 1:26
 "It's Who You Know" – 0:44 (originally performed by X)

Chart positions

Album

References

Albums produced by Paul Leary
Sublime (band) albums
1998 live albums
Demo albums
Compilation albums published posthumously
Live albums published posthumously
Folk rock albums by American artists